Stan Wright (7 March 1918 – 6 January 1992) was an Australian rules footballer who played with Fitzroy in the Victorian Football League (VFL) during the 1940s.

He was the centre half forward in Fitzroy's 1944 VFL Grand Final win over Richmond, kicking one goal.

In 1947, Wright coached the Border United Football Club (Corowa) in Ovens and Murray Football League.

Wright injured his knee in round one, 1947 against Rutherglen Football Club, missed four weeks, then returned against Yarrawonga Football Club in round six, but came off the ground before half time.

Wright unfortunately resigned as coach of Border United FC the next week due to his serious knee injury.

External links

References

1918 births
Australian rules footballers from Victoria (Australia)
Fitzroy Football Club players
Fitzroy Football Club Premiership players
1992 deaths
One-time VFL/AFL Premiership players